Women's 400 metres hurdles event at the 1995 World Championships in Athletics was held in Gothenburg, on 8, 9 and 11 August.

Medalists

Results

Heats
First 3 of each heat (Q) and the next 4 fastest (q) qualified for the semifinals.

Semifinals
First 4 of each heat (Q) qualified directly for the final.

Final

References
 Results
 IAAF

Women's 400 Metres Hurdles
400 metres hurdles at the World Athletics Championships
1995 in women's athletics